E-UTRAN Node B, also known as Evolved Node B (abbreviated as eNodeB or eNB), is the element in E-UTRA of LTE that is the evolution of the element Node B in UTRA of UMTS. It is the hardware that is connected to the mobile phone network that communicates directly wirelessly with mobile handsets (UEs), like a base transceiver station (BTS) in GSM networks.

Traditionally, a Node B has minimum functionality, and is controlled by a Radio Network Controller (RNC). However, with an eNB, there is no separate controller element. This simplifies the architecture and allows lower response times.

Differences between an evolved Node B and a Node B

Air interface  
eNB uses the E-UTRA protocols OFDMA (downlink) and SC-FDMA (uplink) on its LTE-Uu interface. By contrast, NodeB uses the UTRA protocols WCDMA or TD-SCDMA on its Uu interface.

Control functionality 
eNB embeds its own control functionality, rather than using a RNC (Radio Network Controller) as does a Node B.

Network interfaces 
eNB interfaces with the System Architecture Evolution (SAE) core (also known as Evolved Packet Core (EPC)) and other eNB as follows:
 eNB uses the S1-AP protocol on the S1-MME interface with the Mobility Management Entity (MME) for control plane traffic.

References 

LTE (telecommunication)
Telecommunications infrastructure